Icon is an American heavy metal band that formed in 1979, disbanding in 1990. Icon has fully reformed as of 2008, currently consisting of three-fifths of the classic lineup: Dan Wexler (guitar), Stephen Clifford (lead vocals), and John Aquilino (guitar), along with Dave Henzerling (bass) and Gary Bruzzese (drums).

History

Formation
Originally known as The Schoolboys in 1979 (maybe earlier), Icon was formed in 1981, in Phoenix, Arizona, United States, by high school friends Dan Wexler (guitar), Stephen Clifford (lead vocals) and Tracy Wallach (bass). They were joined by Dave Henzerling (guitar) and John Covington (drums). Schoolboys released an EP Singin' Shoutin''' and had a few songs on compilation albums. In 1984, Icon was signed to Capitol Records. By this point, Henzerling and Covington had left the band and were replaced by John Aquilino (guitar) and Pat Dixon (drums) (former drummer for Loosely Tight).

Background
In 1984, Icon released their self-titled debut, Icon, and toured to support it. The tour set list featured quite a few new songs intended for the next album as well as a few Deep Purple ("Highway Star") and Judas Priest covers. In 1985, Night of the Crime was released, produced by Eddie Kramer, mixed by Ron Nevison and featuring the songwriting talent of Bob Halligan Jr. During the mixing of the album, vocalist Stephen Clifford decided to leave the band for personal reasons. Regrouping, the band tried out a few different vocalists, lost their record deal and released a local-only cassette; More Perfect Union, featuring a polished pop-rock sound, a new singer (Jerry Harrison) and a keyboardist (Kevin Stoller). Although it was only released locally, it garnered enough attention to renew major-label interest in the group.

In 1989, Right Between the Eyes was released on Atlantic/Megaforce, with Jerry Harrison on vocals and Drew Bollmann on second guitar.  A video for "Taking My Breath Away" was played on MTV's Headbangers' Ball.  Following the release of Right Between the Eyes and a supporting tour in the US opening for Ace Frehley and in the UK for King's X, the later included David Lauser on drums (currently Sammy Hagar's drummer) replacing Dixon, Icon disbanded.  Singer Harrison recorded with a new project called Harlequin. The other band members continued to be involved in music projects; guitarist Dan Wexler in particular wrote and recorded with Alice Cooper (who had performed backing vocals on "Holy Man's War" from Right Between the Eyes). In 1994, (An Even) More Perfect Union—an expanded version of A More Perfect Union, including tracks recorded for potential release on Right Between the Eyes—was released on CD. 

2008 reunion
In August 2008, Icon celebrated their reunion with a re-issue of a 1984 Bootleg Concert on DVD. Original members Wexler, Aquilino and Dixon, along with former member Dave Henzerling and new singer Scott Hammons had plans to record new material potentially for a new album.

On November 29, 2008, Icon opened up for Tesla at the Dodge Theatre in their home town of Phoenix, Arizona. They received a very warm reception. Copies of their 1984 DVD were signed and sold and the band promised that new material was on the way. 93.3 KDKB, the local rock station, plugged Icon as a band they love yet rarely play.

In May 2009, singer Scott Hammons decided to pursue a solo career so he decided to leave the band and was replaced with former Adler's Appetite vocalist Sheldon Tarsha, with whom the band played at Rocklahoma and opened for Queensrÿche in 2010.
Previous plans to record new songs—possibly for a new album—still exist. However, Tarsha has left the band and original singer Stephen Clifford has been with the band since 2011.

Both the original self-titled album Icon and Night of the Crime were remastered and re-released in 2000 by French hard rock label AxeKiller. "Night of the Crime" was remastered again in 2009 by UK label Rock Candy Records.

Side projects
Wexler participated in other musical projects after Icon's disbandment, most notably co-writing several tracks with Alice Cooper and releasing an album with the band Thieves in the Temple. Henzerling was one of the guitarists for Carmine Appice's band King Kobra; played on the Lizzy Borden album Master of Disguise; and later joined forces with Wexler and Dixon in the band Tomcats. Several Icon members and Surgical Steel drummer Bob Milan backed Arizona vocalist Lydian on her 1990 album "With a Vengeance".

Icon also did a project together with lead singer Randy Baker, founder of the original Strange Daze a Tribute to the Doors band which included a 4-song demo and performing live. According to Baker, "I was never a member of Icon we did a project together as suggested by mutual management."
Members

 Dan Wexler – guitar, backing vocals (1979–1990, 2008–present)
 Stephen Clifford – lead vocals (1979–1985, 2010–present)
 Dave Henzerling – guitar, backing vocals (1979–1981); bass, backing vocals (2008–present)
 John Aquilino – guitar, backing vocals (1981–1987, 2008–present)
 Gary Bruzzese – drums (2010–present)

Former
 Tracy Wallach – bass, backing vocals (1979–1990)
 John Covington – drums (1979–1981)
 Pat Dixon – drums (1981–1989, 2008–2010)
 Steven Young – lead vocals (1985)
 Jerry Harrison – lead vocals (1985–1990)
 Kevin Stoller – keyboards (1987–1989)
 Drew Bollmann – guitar, backing vocals (1989–1990)
 David Lauser – drums (1989-1990)
 Scott Hammons – lead vocals (2008–2009)
 Sheldon Tarsha – lead vocals (2009–2010)

Session
 Mark Prentice – keyboards on More Perfect Union (1987); keyboards on "Forever Young" from Right Between the Eyes (1989)
 Mark Seagraves – keyboard programming on More Perfect Union (1987)
 John Aquilino – guitar on More Perfect Union (1987)
 Alice Cooper – vocals on "Two for the Road" and featured character on "Holy Man's War" from Right Between the Eyes (1989)
 Kevin Stroller – keyboards on Right Between the Eyes (1989)

Timeline

Discography
Studio albumsIcon (1984)Night of the Crime (1985)A More Perfect Union (1987)Right Between the Eyes (1989)

Live albums1984: Live Bootleg CD and VHS (1999)
Video and Live sound recording by Paul Gasparola

Compilation albumsAn Even More Perfect Union'' (1995)

References

External links

Heavy metal musical groups from Arizona
American glam metal musical groups
Musical groups established in 1981
Capitol Records artists
Musical quintets
Musical groups disestablished in 1998
Musical groups reestablished in 2008
Musical groups from Phoenix, Arizona